The Last Victim is a 1975 Soviet drama film directed by Pyotr Todorovsky. Based on the play of the same name by Alexander Ostrovsky.

Plot 
A woman who loves is ready to sacrifice for the salvation of her beloved with all her fortune. How will Vadim Dulchin, a handsome man and a player, answer this? And how far can a woman who loves him go.

Cast 
 Margarita Volodina as Yuliya Pavlovna Tugina
 Oleg Strizhenov as Vadim Dulchin
 Mikhail Gluzsky as Flor Fedulych
 Leonid Kuravlyov as Lavr Mironych Pribytkov  
 Olga Naumenko as Irina Lavrovna Pribytkova  
 Vladimir Kenigson as Salay Saltanych Banvar  
 Valeri Filatov as Luka Gerasimovich Dergachyov  
 Maria Vinogradova as Mikheyevna  
 Pavel Vinnik as Kislovsky  
 Lionella Pyryeva as Kruglaya
 Viktor Proskurin as hussar
 Valentina Ananina as merchant's wife

References

External links 
 

1975 films
1970s Russian-language films
Soviet drama films
1975 drama films
Films based on works by Alexander Ostrovsky
Films directed by Pyotr Todorovsky
Mosfilm films